The 2014–15 season was the 113th season of competitive football in Italy.

Promotions and relegations (pre-season)
Teams promoted to Serie A
 Palermo
 Empoli
 Cesena

Teams relegated from Serie A
 Bologna
 Catania
 Livorno

Teams promoted to Serie B
 Pro Vercelli
 Perugia
 Virtus Entella
 Frosinone

Teams relegated from Serie B
 Novara
 Padova
 Juve Stabia
 Reggina

League tables

Serie A

Serie B

Juventus

Coppa Italia

Road to the final

UEFA Champions League

Group stage

Knockout phase

Round of 16

Quarter-finals

Semi-finals

Final

References

 
Seasons in Italian football
2014 in Italian sport
2014 in association football
2015 in Italian sport
2015 in association football